Neded is a village and municipality in Šaľa District, in the Nitra Region of south-west Slovakia.

Geography
The village lies at an altitude of 112 metres and covers an area of 36.009 km².

History
In historical records the village was first mentioned in 1113.
After the Austro-Hungarian army disintegrated in November 1918, Czechoslovak troops occupied the area, later acknowledged internationally by the Treaty of Trianon. Between 1938 and 1945 Neded once more  became part of Miklós Horthy's Hungary through the First Vienna Award. From 1945 until the Velvet Divorce, it was part of Czechoslovakia. Since then it has been part of Slovakia.

Population
According to the 2011 census, the municipality had 3,301 inhabitants. 1,820 of inhabitants were Hungarians, 1,241 Slovaks,  103 Roma and 137 others and unspecified.

References

Facilities
The village has a public library, car wash, and a gym.

External links
http://www.statistics.sk/mosmis/eng/run.html

Villages and municipalities in Šaľa District
Hungarian communities in Slovakia